BC Yambol is a Bulgarian professional basketball club based in Yambol. Founded in 1945, Yambol has won the Bulgarian championship once as Yambolgas. They play their home matches at the Diana Hall. The team is a regular first league participant. Former names of the club are Luskov, Tundja, Yambolen and Yambolgas.

History
Founded in 1945, the club joined the third edition of the Bulgarian Championship to become the first participant of this basketball championship based outside of the capital Sofia.

In 1976 the club, as "Luskov"-Yambol, appointed Simeon Varchev as new head coach, who work there until 1980. He recruit some new young players including Georgi Glouchkov, the first bulgarian played in NBA. In 1977 they won the first medal for the club, third place in the Bulgarian Cup and in 1979 the bronze medal in Bulgarian Championship. In 1980 Georgi Glouchkov moved to PBC CSKA Sofia, captain of the team Ivan Angelov retired, and even though Varchev and Ivan Glavov (one of the leading playmakers in league the time) stayed, the club relegated in to the second tier.

Yambol stayed there until 1992, when it got promoted and since then remains in the top flight. The coach of the club was Ivan Cholakov, who was team head coach in two periods- 1989-2002 and 2004-2013. In 2002, with the name of Yambolgas by sponsorship reasons, the club won the Bulgarian Championship after winning to Lukoil Academic by 3–0 in the final series.

Honours
Bulgarian Championship
 Winners (1): 2002
 Runners-up (1): 2001
Bronze medalist (5): 1979, 2000, 2003, 2011, 2012
Bulgarian Cup
 Bronze medalist (4): 1977, 2000, 2001, 2002

Roster 2022-2023

In Europe
BC Yambol played in FIBA Korać Cup(2000,2001), FIBA Europe Champions Cup for Men 2003/Conference South and NEBL Open 2001/2002.

1999–2000 FIBA Korać Cup

2000–01 FIBA Korać Cup

2002–03 FIBA Europe Champions Cup

Season by season

Notable players

 Georgi Glouchkov
 Dimitar Angelov
 Georgi Stankov
 Valcho Yordanov
 Ivan Angelov
 Ivan Glavov
 Geno Plachkov
 Dimitar Dimitrov
 Georgi Kovachev
 Emil Stamenov
 Stanislav Govedarov
 Dimitar Horozov
 Decho Koeshinov
 Rumen Shopov
 Martin Durchev
 Pavel Marinov
 Yulian Radionov
 Nikolay Varbanov
 Pavlin Ivanov
 Franko Kaštropil
 Nemanja Milošević
 Ninoslav Tmušić
 Nenad Djorić
 Zoran Stevanovic
 John Ofoegbu
 Tony Gugino  
 Yaroslav Zubrytskiy
 Volodymyr Ryzhov
 Sergey Grishaev
 Anatoliy Yasinskiy

Head coaches

  Slavcho Slavov 1956-1959
  Dobri Rusev 1959-1960
  Ivan Stoyanov 1960-1964
  Blagoy Peev 1964-1965
  Ivan Stoyanov 1965-1969
  Velcho Petrov 1969-1972
  Valcho Yordanov 1972-1976
 Simeon Varchev 1976-1980
  Ivan Glavov 1980-1981
  Hristo Kostov 1981-1984
  Ivan Angelov 1984-1986
  Velcho Petrov 1986-1987
  Mityo Georgiev 1987-1989
 Ivan Cholakov 1989-20021
 Zoran Krečković 2002–2003
  Valeri Bachvarov 2003-2004
 Ivan Cholakov 2004-20132
 Yulian Radionov 2013–2015
 Petar Petrov 2015–20173
 Ivan Cholakov 2017–2020
 Toni Dechev 2020–2022
 Aleksander Aleksiev 2022–present

1During the 2001–02 season, Vitaly Lebedintsev coached 6 regular season games. Lebedintsev was fired on November 2001, and Ivan Cholakov coached the remaining season games.
2During the 2010–11 season, Ivailo Stoimenov coached 7 regular season games. Stoimenov resigned on November 29, 2010, and Ivan Cholakov coached the remaining season games.
3During the 2015–16 season, Ninoslav Marjanovic coached 9 regular season games. Marjanovic resigned on December 5, 2015.

References

External links
Official website
Eurobasket.com BC Yambol Page

Basketball teams in Bulgaria
Basketball teams established in 1945
Yambol